The DP World Berbera New Port, also known as DP World Berbera, is the new port of the DP World in the city of Berbera and its only branch in Republic of Somaliland.

Overview

In May 2016, DP World signed a US$442 million agreement with the government of Somaliland, to operate a regional trade and logistics hub at the Port of Berbera. The project, which will be phased in, will also involve the setting up of a free zone.

On 1 March 2018, Ethiopia became a major shareholder following an agreement with DP World and the Somaliland Port Authority. DP World holds a 51% stake in the project, Somaliland 30% and Ethiopia the remaining 19%.

On 24 July 2021, The new container terminal in Berbera Port was officially inaugurated by Muse Bihi Abdi, President of Somaliland, Sultan Ahmed bin Sulayem, Group Chairman and CEO of DP World and a government delegation from Ethiopia, led by Ahmed Shide Minister of Finance and Dagmawit Moges Minister of Transport A new 400-meter berth and three ship gantry cranes with a capacity of 500,000 TEUs per year.

Berbera Corridor

The construction of the Berbera corridor was an integral part of a contract agreement made by the Somaliland government and the United Arab Emirates and its owned port company Dubai Ports World.

Expansion & Growth Forecast

According to World Bank, the volumes handled in the Port of Berbera are expected to increase from 3.0
million ton in 2016 to 18.1 million ton in 2050. With approximately 47.1 percent of the volumes
handled by the Port of Berbera in 2050, dry bulks are predicted to be the largest cargo type, followed
by containers with 39.4 percent and general cargo with 9.3 percent. Containerized cargo is split equally between imports and exports, whereas dry bulks are expected to consist entirely of imports. General cargo exports represent about 90 percent of total volumes in 2050, with livestock being the primary export commodity. With just 10,000 tons (about 7,000 vehicle units) in 2050, vehicles represent the smallest cargo type. As there is not export of crude oil, liquid bulk volumes are not a significant import commodity either in 2050, representing just 0.8 million ton in 2050. Total volumes are expected to increase with a compounded annual growth rate of 8.7 percent in 2016-2030, 3.8 percent in 2030-2040, and 2.7 percent in 2040-2050. The large difference in these growth rates is because Berbera is expected to capture 7.5 percent of the Ethiopian container, dry bulk, and general cargo volumes between 2021 and 2025.

See also
Somaliland
DP World
Port of Berbera
Transportation in Somaliland

References

External links 

 

Geography of Somaliland
Sahil, Somaliland
Berbera
Berbera